Lönnroth is a surname. Notable people with the surname include:

Erik Lönnroth (1910–2002), Swedish historian
Hjalmar Lönnroth (1856–1935), Swedish sailor
Johan Lönnroth (born 1937), Swedish politician and economist
Lars Lönnroth (born 1935), Swedish literary scholar